Jay Mumford (born February 26, 1977), better known by his stage name J-Zone, is an American record producer, drummer, multi-instrumentalist, rapper, and writer from New York City.

Career
Known for his quirky lyrics and trash talk style of rapping, J-Zone released a string of idiosyncratic and critically acclaimed albums in the late 1990s and early 2000s that acquired a cult following. Of these, the 2001 release Pimps Don't Pay Taxes, was particularly noted; it featured rappers Huggy Bear and Al-Shid, for whom he would subsequently produce a number of 12" releases. In 2003, The New York Times cited his J-Zone, S.A. Smash concert in Brooklyn, New York as a noteworthy pop and jazz concert in the New York metropolitan region.

Not finding commercial success, J-Zone eventually walked away from rap, and in 2011 published the book Root for the Villain: Rap, Bullshit and a Celebration of Failure. The book has been well received; the Los Angeles Times Music Blog stated that "Like his albums, it's equal parts hilarious, self-effacing and sharp. He's the sarcastic older brother putting you up on game. It's a love letter to rap laced with sulfur, the flip side of Dan Charnas' similarly excellent The Big Payback." The Washington Post Going Out Gurus blog called it "a must for every curmudgeonly grown-up hip-hop head", while Nathan Rabin writing for The A.V. Club called it "one of the funniest and most honest books ever written about the modern music industry and its luckless casualties."

In 2013, J-Zone returned to music with the release of the album, Peter Pan Syndrome, which was listed as the 17th best album of 2013 by Spin. After learning to play drums seriously during his hiatus from music, J-Zone released the drum break album, Lunch Breaks, in 2014.

In 2016 J-Zone landed a spot playing drums on new tunes from the 1970s funk band Manzel, his band The Du-Rites with Tom Tom Club guitarist Pablo Martin, and for personal drum break kits for Danger Mouse and others.

J-Zone has continued working as a session drummer in recent years, appearing on Lord Finesse's Motown State of Mind album in 2020, in addition to his drums being sampled on the 2020 Madlib single, "Road of The Lonely Ones".

In 2022, J-Zone was the drummer for live shows and select recordings for The Black Pumas guitarist Adrian Quesada's Boleros Psicodelicos album.

Discography

Albums
 Music for Tu Madre (1998)
 Pimps Don't Pay Taxes (2001)
 $ick of Bein' Rich (2003)
 A Job Ain't Nuthin but Work (2004)
 Gimme Dat Beat Fool: The J-Zone Remix Project (2005)
 Every Hog Has Its Day (2006) 
 Experienced! (2006)
 To Love a Hooker: The Motion Picture Soundtrack (2007)
 The Analog Catalog: 2001-2007 (2007)
 Live at the Liqua Sto (2008)
 Peter Pan Syndrome (2013)
 Lunch Breaks (2014)
 Backyard Breaks (2015)
 Fish N' Grits (2016)
 J-Zone and Pablo Martin Are The Du-Rites (2016) 
 Greasy Listening (2017) 
 Guerrilla Drums (2018)
 Gamma Ray Jones (2018) 
 Soundcheck at 6 (2019) 
 Break Bonanza (2019)
 A Funky Bad Time (2020) 
 Concussion Percussion (2021)
 Pressure (2021)

EPs
 A Bottle of Whup Ass (2000)
 The Hogs Sing the Hits: Pig Parodies (2006) 
 The 1993 Demos EP (2013)

Singles
 "No Consequences" (2000)
 "Zone for President" (2000)
 "Q&A" (2002)
 "5 Star Hooptie" (2003)
 "Choir Practice" (2003)
 "A Friendly Game of Basketball" (2004)
 "Greater Later Remix" (2005)
 "Steady Smobbin'" b/w "Celph Destruction" (2006)  
 "The Drug Song (Remix)" b/w "The Fox Hunt" (2012)
 "Zonestitution" (2013)
 "Stick Up" b/w "Mad Rap" (2014)
 "I Smell Smoke" b/w "Time for a Crime Wave" (2015)
 "Seoul Power" b/w "I'm Sick of Rap" (2015)
 "Funky" b/w "Go Back to Sellin' Weed" (2016)
 "Bug Juice" b/w "Hustle" (2016) 
 "Bite It" b/w "Bocho's Groove" (2017) 
 "High and Tight" b/w "Standing on Mars" (2017) 
 "Gamma Ray Funk" b/w "Fish Sammich" (2018) 
 "The Mean Machine" b/w "Corinthian Leather" (2018) 
 "Zodiac" b/w "Monster" (2019) 
 "Neckbones (Live)" b/w "Gittin' Sound" (2019) 
 "Mad Dog" b/w "Cheap Cologne" (2019) 
 "Jheri Curl" b/w "Du-Vibrations" (2020)

Guest appearances
 Princess Superstar - "I Love You (or at Least I Like You)" from Princess Superstar Is (2001)
 Jehst - "Staircase to Stage" from The Return of the Drifter (2002)
 Danger Mouse & Jemini the Gifted One - "Take Care of Business" from Ghetto Pop Life (2003)
 Apathy & Celph Titled - "Nut Reception" from No Place Like Chrome (2006)

Productions
 Cage - "In Stoney Lodge" from Movies for the Blind (2002)
 Cage - "Too Much (Remix)" from Weatherproof (2003)
 Biz Markie - "Chinese Food" from Weekend Warrior (2003)
 Leak Bros - "G.O.D." from Waterworld (2004)
 7L & Esoteric - "Neverending Saga" from DC2: Bars of Death (2004)
 MF Grimm - "Dancin'" from Digital Tears: E-mail from Purgatory (2004)
 R.A. the Rugged Man - "Brawl" from Die, Rugged Man, Die (2004)
 Prince Po - "It's Goin' Down" and "Meet Me at the Bar" from The Slickness (2004)
 Casual - "Say That Then" and "Hieroller" from Smash Rockwell (2005)
 Awol One - "This Far" from The War of Art (2006)
 Juggaknots - "Crazy 8's" from Use Your Confusion (2006)
 Sadat X - "X Is a Machine" from Black October (2006)
 Apathy & Celph Titled - "S.M.D." from No Place Like Chrome (2006)
 Akrobatik - "Absolute Value" from Absolute Value (2008)
 Del the Funky Homosapien - "Funkyhomosapien" from Eleventh Hour (2008)
 The Lonely Island - "Santana DVX" from Incredibad (2009)
 Mr. Lif - "Gun Fight" from I Heard It Today (2009)
 CunninLynguists - "Cocaine" from Strange Journey Volume Two (2009)
 Canibus - "Free Words" from C of Tranquility (2010)

Books
 Root for the Villain: Rap, Bullshit, and a Celebration of Failure (Old Maid Entertainment, 2011)

References

Further reading

External links
 
 
 

Living people
1977 births
Alternative hip hop musicians
American hip hop record producers
Record producers from New York (state)
Rappers from New York City
21st-century American rappers